was a Japanese virologist known for identifying the molecular structure of Human T-lymphotropic virus 1 responsible for Adult T-cell leukemia/lymphoma.

Life
Yoshida was born in Toyama, Japan and received his Ph.D. in 1967 from the University of Tokyo. After his postdoctoral fellowship at MRC Laboratory of Molecular Biology, he worked to uncover the relationship between oncovirus and carcinogenesis at the Cancer Institute, Japanese Foundation for Cancer Research from 1975 to 1989. He was appointed as Professor at the Institute of Medical Science, University of Tokyo in 1989, where he served as Dean from 1996 to 1998. After retiring from the University of Tokyo and becoming Professor Emeritus, he was Director at the Tsukuba Research Institute of BANYU Pharmaceutical Co. (Merck & Co. today) in Tsukuba and Director at the Cancer Chemotherapy Center, Japanese Foundation for Cancer Research.

Awards
1982: Princess Takamatsu Cancer Research Fund Prize
1986: Asahi Prize
1999: Tomizo Yoshida Award
2000: Medal with Purple Ribbon (Japanese Government)

References

External links

1939 births
Living people
Cancer researchers
Japanese virologists
Japanese molecular biologists
Academic staff of the University of Tokyo
University of Tokyo alumni
People from Toyama Prefecture